Moss–Johnson Farm, also known as the Johnson Farm, is a historic farm complex located near Hendersonville, Henderson County, North Carolina, United States. The farmhouse was built between 1874 and 1880, and is a rectangular brick dwelling measuring 50 feet by 28 feet.  Also on the property are the contributing clapboard summer house (1920), a granary and smokehouse (1880), a well, a barn (1923), a small dwelling (1933), and a hen house and pig barn.  After 1970 the property was donated in several gifts to the Henderson County Board of Education for use as a farm museum.

It was listed on the National Register of Historic Places in 1987.

References

External links
Historic Johnson Farm

Farm museums in North Carolina
Farms on the National Register of Historic Places in North Carolina
Houses completed in 1880
Buildings and structures in Henderson County, North Carolina
National Register of Historic Places in Henderson County, North Carolina
Hendersonville, North Carolina